Scorpio Rising is the sixth studio album by American metal band Prong, their first after a gap of seven years. The song "Embrace the Depth" first appeared on the 2002 live album 100% Live under the title "Initiation", and was co-written by Pat Lachman.

Track listing 
"Detached" – 3:29
"All Knowing Force" – 2:42
"Embrace the Depth" – 4:05
"Reactive Mind" – 2:24
"Regal" – 2:45
"Inner Truth" – 2:48
"Avoid Promises" – 3:16
"Siriusly Emerging" – 3:50
"Assurances" – 3:22
"Out of This Realm" – 3:14
"Letter to a 'Friend – 4:58
"Entrance of the Eclipse" – 4:10
"Red Martial Working" – 3:53
"Hidden Agenda" – 4:40

Reception

Chronicles of Chaos gave a neutral impression of the album, with a general summary of "average" across all facets - music, lyrics, and vocals. Of particular comparison to previous albums was the failure of any particular song to stand out in quality.

Decibel provided a mixed review, complimenting Tommy Victor's "big riffs" but otherwise feeling it under-performed with an ugly cover and under-cooked production. In contrast to COC's review, Decibel specifically noted that each song did use unique mixes of riffs, but that the differences were subtle to the level of requiring specific attention to note differences.

AllMusic also gave a mixed review, complimenting "The gritty guitars, the stop/start rhythms, the anger and the vicious ill will", but again noting the lack of any standout tunes and the absence of any general difference from their earlier music.

Personnel
Tommy Victor – vocals, guitar, bass
Monte Pittman – bass, guitar
Dan Laudo – drums

References

Prong (band) albums
2003 albums
Locomotive Music albums
Albums produced by Tommy Victor